Minuscule 506 (in the Gregory-Aland numbering), δ 101 (in the Soden numbering), is a Greek minuscule manuscript of the New Testament, on parchment. Palaeographically it has been assigned to the 11th-century. 
Scrivener labelled it by number 492e, 193a, 277p, and 26r. It was adapted for liturgical use.

Description 

The codex contains the text of the four New Testament on 240 parchment leaves (size ) with numerous lacunae. It is written in two columns per page, 36 lines per page. It has 12 omissions by homoioteleuton, N εφελκυστικον with ειπεν occurs 190 times, elsewhere 392 times in the Gospels. It has a large number of the itacistic errors (658). Codex contains a large number of the transcriptural errors.

There is also a division according to the Ammonian Sections (in Mark 233 sections, the last section in 16:8) in black, with references to the Eusebian Canons in red.

Some illuminations were cut out. It has also some other material about synods, about Joseph, epistle of Basil to Gregory of Nyssa.

 Lacunae
Luke 16:26-30; 17:5-8; 24:22-24; John 1:1-7:39; 8:31-9:11; 10:10-11:54; 12:36-13:27; Acts 1:1-7:49; 10:19-14:10; 15:15-16:11; 18:1-21:25; 23:18-28:31; James 1:1-3:17; 1 Corinthians 12:11-15:12; 16:13-15; 2 Corinthians 13:4. 5; Galatians [5:16-6:1]; 6:1-18; 2 Timothy 3:10. 11; Titus 3:5-7.

Text 

The Greek text of the codex is a representative of the Byzantine text-type. Hermann von Soden included it to the textual family Kx. Aland placed it in Category V.

According to the Claremont Profile Method it represents textual cluster 276 in Luke 1, Luke 10, and Luke 20.

History 

Gregory dated the manuscript to the 11th or 12th-century. Currently it is dated by the INTF to the 11th-century.

The manuscript was written by Dionysius, a scribe (hence name of the codex). The manuscript came from Constantinople to England about 1731 and belonged to archbishop of Canterbury, William Wake, together with minuscule manuscripts 73, 74, 507-520. Wake presented it to the Christ Church College in Oxford. In 1732 John Walker slightly collated it for Bentley. Gregory saw it in 1883.

The manuscript was thoroughly collated by Scrivener (as Wd) in 1864 and was added to the list of the New Testament minuscule manuscripts (as 492e, 193a, 277p, and 26r). C. R. Gregory gave for it 506e, 199a, 256p, and 26r. In 1908 Gregory gave for it one number for all parts of the codex - 506.

Herman C. Hoskier collated the text of the Apocalypse.

It is currently housed at the Christ Church (Wake 12) in Oxford.

See also 

 List of New Testament minuscules
 Biblical manuscript
 Textual criticism

References

Further reading 

 George William Kitchin, Catalogus codicum MSS. qui in bibliotheca Aedis Christi, Oxford 1867.
 F. H. A. Scrivener, Adversaria Critica Sacra: With a Short Explanatory Introduction (Cambridge, 1893), pp. XXXIV-XXXVI. (as e)
 Herman C. Hoskier, Concerning the Text of the Apocalypse (London 1929), vol. 1, p. 55. (only of Revelation)

External links 

Greek New Testament minuscules
11th-century biblical manuscripts